Synchron Stage Vienna is a recording facility specializing in recording large orchestras and film music. The landmark protected building, formerly "Synchronhalle" ("Hall 6") of the historic film lot "Film City Vienna" in the Austrian capital's 23rd district is operated by Vienna Symphonic Library.

History 

The building was constructed by the National Socialists from 1939 to 1941 for picture-synchronized sound recordings, from which the name "Synchronhalle" derived. Joseph Goebbels is said to have commissioned the construction himself in order to shoot Nazi propaganda films with the UFA film stars of the time in Vienna. A company-owned airport and a subway station directly in front of the entrance to the film studios were planned for fast transportation.

This plan was considered in the construction of the facility: In order to shield noise and vibrations from the outside world, the hall was isolated from the rest of the building by a custom foundation and insulated against air traffic by an elaborate roof structure. The result was a house-in-house construction with the recording rooms inside. The outer shell provided office space as well as cutting rooms.

Until the 1950s, the facility shared its history with the Rosenhügel-Filmstudios. At that time the "Synchronhalle" hosted as many as ten large orchestra film score projects per year. A remnant of the building's designated use is the preserved "Lenkwil" cinema organ with three manuals that features not only various instrumental timbres but also sound effects such as rolling thunder, car horns, clopping horses, twittering birds and ocean waves. It is the only cinema organ in the world that is still housed in its original scoring stage. Because of this combination the Federal Monuments Office classified this building as a historical monument.

In the mid-1960s, the complex was acquired by the Austrian Broadcasting Corporation (ORF), initializing an era of revival. Eminent classical artists such as Karl Böhm, Herbert von Karajan, Yehudi Menuhin, Sviatoslav Richter and Mstislav Rostropovich discovered the exceptional acoustic properties and used the "Synchronhalle" for many legendary recordings. 

After a few years, the use of the hall came to a standstill. Until 1990, it was primarily used as a rehearsal stage for the Theater an der Wien. The ORF made several efforts to sell the entire area. The landmark protection of the two halls 1 (artificial light studio) and 6 (Synchronhalle) made this impossible. In the end, all surrounding buildings on the site were demolished.

In 1990, a private investor planned to build a supermarket and shopping center in the Synchronhalle. This was prevented by the commitment of ORF's General Director, Thaddäus Podgorski. The ORF initially bought back the area and leased it to Filmstadt Wien GmbH. Subsequently, films such as Der Bockerer II - Österreich ist frei (1996), Comedian Harmonists (1997) and Die Klavierspielerin (2001) were shot on the Rosenhügel.

2013: Acquisition and renovation 
The hall was purchased by the Vienna Symphonic Library in 2013 and developed into a globally unique music production facility in collaboration with the renowned Walters-Storyk Design Group and architects Schneider+Schumacher. It was completed in September 2015. The heart of the more than 2,000 m² area is the large recording hall, Stage A: with its 540 m², it offers space for an orchestra of up to 130 people.

The first project was recorded in October 2015 with Grammy Award winning recording and mixing engineer Dennis Sands and composer/orchestrator/conductor, Conrad Pope. Shortly after the official opening, Hans Zimmer's Remote Control Productions chose Synchron Stage Vienna to record a whole slate of productions, including music for Inferno, starring Tom Hanks (directed by Ron Howard, music by Hans Zimmer), and the Netflix series The Crown by Peter Morgan (music by Hans Zimmer and Rupert Gregson-Williams).

In March 2016, the Vienna Symphonic Library business offices moved into the new facility. Synchron Stage Vienna 's acoustic design was nominated for 32nd TEC Award at NAMM Show in Anaheim 2017.

Recording facilities 

Synchron Stage Vienna is a recording facility that merges traditional and novel recording technologies and workflows with Vienna Symphonic Library's software innovations. It combines a scoring stage with several studios, isolation booths and office space used by clients and Vienna Symphonic Library's software and sample development business.

Stage A, the large main hall, accommodates orchestras of up to 130 musicians and is built as a room-in-room construction, with an up to 10-foot gap between walls, ensuring entire sonic isolation from outside noise. Additional studios and offices surround the central stage, including Stage B, another recording room, Control Rooms A and B, several lounges, isolation booths ("iso booths"), instrument storage rooms and a score archive. The facility offers the ability to route any signal source to any room of the building, including offices, without any latency or loss of audio quality. The stages and control rooms can be configured modularly depending on the recording requirements. Film composers can record their scores or augment their virtual symphonic cues with a real orchestra.

The basement comprises storage rooms for pianos and approximately 300 percussion instruments. All rooms are connected to the same ventilation system used by the recording stages, so the stored instruments are always pre-acclimated for recording. An elevator connects the storage rooms directly with Stage A.

Since 2021, Synchron Stage Vienna has been an official Dolby Atmos studio and can offer recordings in Auro-3D in addition to stereo and surround.

Instruments 

Synchron Stage Vienna currently offers four concert grand pianos, a Steinway D-274 and two remotely accessible pianos, a Bösendorfer 290 Imperial with CEUS performance reproducing system and a Yamaha Disklavier CFX EN PRO and a Fazioli F308.

The Bösendorfer CEUS technology and the Yamaha Disklavier reproducing system incorporate computer controlled mechanisms to record performances and accurately play them back on the acoustic instrument. With the CEUS system, solenoids activate each key and pedal to mirror the original, recorded performance. The ability to accurately capture a performance in terms of timing and loudness is an important step in retaining the player's unique expression. The performance reproducing pianos have several applications, e.g., a recorded piano performance can be edited in order to correct notes or to adjust dynamics and timing. Furthermore, a single pianist has the opportunity to perform a piece for four hands, accompanying an initial performance with a second take. A piano performance, played anywhere in the world, can be reproduced and recorded in one of Synchron Stage's rooms.

Furthermore, the numerous percussion instruments and a Lyon & Healey harp are available for recordings.

Synchron Stage Orchestra 
The in-house "Synchron Stage Orchestra" is not a fixed ensemble but draws on a large pool of musicians from Vienna and the surrounding area. They play in all the major orchestras in Vienna and have been selected according to strict criteria to meet the demands of modern media music productions. Contractor Marton Barka is responsible for putting together the right instrumentalists for each project. Depending on the requirements, a wide range of styles can be covered, from classical film music and big band to pop/rock and jazz.

Projects 
In addition to sampling sessions for the Vienna Symphonic Library's products, the Synchron Stage Vienna has established itself as a fixture in the international film industry, regularly hosted music recordings for national and international film and television productions since its opening. Production companies from around the world, including Netflix, Sony Pictures Entertainment, Terra Mater Factual Studios, Marvel Studios and more, regularly record with the "Synchron Stage Orchestra".

Recent notable projects include the film scores for The Meg (2018), Ad Astra (2019), Klaus (2019), as well as Promising Young Woman (2020) and Over the Moon (2020). With the 2022 blockbuster Moonfall, Roland Emmerich had his film score recorded in Vienna for the second time in a row. For the final soundtrack, recordings with the Synchron Stage Orchestra were partially combined with samples from the Vienna Symphonic Library.

The music for the successful Marvel miniseries WandaVision (which was nominated 21 times for the 2021 Primetime Emmy Awards), Hawkeye, Moon Knight, She-Hulk: Attorney at Law and Ms. Marvel was also recorded at Synchron Stage.

List of projects

2022

2021

2020

2019

2018

2017

2016

Web links 

 Synchron Stage Vienna Website
 Synchron Stage Orchestra on IMDB
 Vienna Symphonic Library Website

References 

Buildings and structures completed in the 11th century
Buildings and structures in Vienna
Recording studios in Austria